Shining Stars: The Official Story of Earth, Wind & Fire is a 2001 film biography of the band Earth, Wind & Fire. It was released on August 21, 2001, and was directed by Kathryn Arnold and produced by Stephanie Bennett. It was made with the band's input and has both concert footage and interviews with the members of the group.

External links
 
 

2001 films
Documentary films about music and musicians
Earth, Wind & Fire video albums
2000s English-language films